Abelin is a surname, and may refer to:

Jean-Pierre Abelin (born 1950), French politician
Johann Philipp Abelin (died 1634), German historian
 Ernst Abelin (born 1933), Swiss psychoanalyst and founder of the theory of early triangulation